The 1981 1. divisjon was the 37th completed season of top division football in Norway.

Overview
22 games were played with 2 points given for wins and 1 for draws. Number eleven and twelve were relegated. The winners of the two groups of the Second Division were promoted, as well as the winner of a series of play-off matches between number ten in the 1. divisjon and the two second-placed teams in the two groups of the 2. divisjon. 

Vålerengen won the championship, their second league title.

Teams and locations
''Note: Table lists in alphabetical order.

League table

Results

Relegation play-offs
The qualification play-off matches were contested between Brann (10th in the 1. divisjon), Pors (2nd in the Second Division – Group A), and Molde (2nd in the 2. divisjon – Group B). Molde won on goal difference and were promoted to the 1. divisjon.

Results
Molde 3–1 Pors
Pors 2–1 Brann
Brann 1–0 Molde

Season statistics

Top scorer
 Pål Jacobsen, Vålerengen – 16 goals

Attendances

References
Norway – List of final tables (RSSSF)
Norsk internasjonal fotballstatistikk (NIFS)

Eliteserien seasons
Norway
Norway
1